The César E. Chávez Learning Academies, also known as Valley Region High School 5 (VRHS #5), is a public high school of the Los Angeles Unified School District. It is located in the City of San Fernando in the San Fernando Valley region of the Los Angeles metropolitan area, in the US state of California. It is named after César Chávez.

The school opened in 2011, relieving overcrowding at San Fernando High School, Sylmar High School, Kennedy High School, and Verdugo Hills High School. When the school opened it had 1,600 students. Its design was based on historical California missions. The school campus is divided into four academies: Technology Prep Academy, ArTES, Social Justice Humanitas Academy, and San Fernando Academy of Scientific Exploration (ASE).

Athletics

The Eagles finished the 2016 football season with a record of 8-2 that gave them the home field advantage throughout their first two playoff games, advancing all the way to the city semi-finals, led by head coach Rodrigo Nuñez. In the 2016–2017 season the Eagles went undefeated against their rivals, Verdugo Hills High School and James Monroe High School; and their division one rivals, Arleta High.

In 2018, the junior varsity football team became the first undefeated team in the school's history.

References

External links
 
 "Valley Region High School #5 Seeks Official Name" (Archive)

High schools in Los Angeles County, California
High schools in the San Fernando Valley
San Fernando, California
Los Angeles Unified School District schools
2011 establishments in California
Educational institutions established in 2011